TG or Tg may stand for:

Arts and entertainment

Gaming
 The Gathering (computer party), the second largest computer party in the world
 Travian Games, a German video game development and publisher company

Television
 Telegiornale (disambiguation), the Italian word for television newscast
 Top Gear, a British motoring television series
 Top Gear (1977 TV series), original version running from 1977 to 2001
 Top Gear (2002 TV series), revived version running since 2002
 Windows TG, a fictional operating system featured in the show Mega64

Other media
 Throbbing Gristle, an English music and visual arts group formed in 1976
 Ferdinand Tönnies Gesamtausgabe, the complete work edition of Ferdinand Tönnies

Businesses and organizations
 TG Xers, a team in the Korean Basketball League, now renamed Wonju Dongbu Promy
 Thai Airways International (IATA code TG)
 Theodore Goddard, a law firm established by John Theodore Goddard, solicitor to Wallis Simpson
 ThinkGeek, an internet retailer
 Torture Garden (fetish club), the fetish club organizers
 Toyota Group, auto manufacturer
 TransDigm Group, a manufacturer of aerospace components
 Travian Games, a German video game company
 Triumph Group, an aftermarket repair company in Wayne, Pennsylvania, US

People
 Thomas Hopkins Gallaudet, founder of Gallaudet University
 Timo Glock, Formula 1 driver for Virgin Racing

Places
 Talbot Gardens, a hockey arena in Norfolk County, Ontario, Canada
 Târgu-Mureş, a Romanian city
 Tehri Garhwal district, a district in the state of Uttarakhand, India
 Telangana, a state in southern India
 Thurgau, a canton in Switzerland
 Togo (ISO 3166-1 country code TG)

Science, technology, and mathematics

Biology and medicine
 Thapsigargin, a sesquiterpene lactone and tumor promoter
 Thyroglobulin, a protein
 Transgenic, referring to genetic material that has been transferred from one organism to another
 Triglyceride, the main constituents of body fat in humans and animals
 Trigeminal nerve, one of the cranial nerves.

Computing
 .tg, the country code top level domain (ccTLD) for Togo
 Telegram (software), online messaging service
 Terragen, a scenery rendering software

 TriGem, a South Korean computer company
 Turbo Gears, a Python web application framework

Mathematics
 Tangent, a trigonometric function 
 Tarski–Grothendieck set theory, an axiomatic set theory

Vehicles
 Messerschmitt TG500, a four-wheeled car designed by German engineer Fritz Fend based on his three-wheeled Messerschmitt KR200 microcar
 Tank Grote (sometimes misspelled "Grotte"), an experimental multi-turreted Soviet medium tank
 Tiangong space station, a Chinese space station

Other uses in science and technology
 Tear gas, a riot control agent
 Teragram, a unit of mass equal to 1012 grams; equivalent to a megatonne
 Thermogravimetry, a branch of physical chemistry, materials research, and thermal analysis
 Transformational grammar, a generative grammar developed in the Chomskyan tradition
 Glass transition temperature (abbreviated Tg)

Other uses
 Tajik language (ISO 639-1 code "tg")
 Target group, also target audience, in marketing, the primary group of people that a campaign is aimed at
 Task group or task force, a group of specialists created to solve some problem
 Thanksgiving, a holiday celebrated primarily in the United States and Canada
 Transgender, a term given to individuals that deviate from the normative gender role

See also
 T&G (disambiguation)